Syaeful Anwar (born 1 December 1994) is an Indonesian professional footballer who plays as a defender for Liga 1 club Arema.

Club career

Bali United
Syaeful made his professional debut with Bali United in President Cup 2015. But soon after his contract was terminated because of long term injury.

Persibat Batang
In 2017, Syaeful Anwar signed a contract with Indonesian Liga 2 club Persibat Batang.

Semen Padang
He joined Semen Padang who competed for Liga 2 in February 2018. He played only for 2 matches in his first season while Semen Padang FC getting promoted to Liga 1. On 16 August 2019, Syaeful made his Liga 1 debut against PSIS Semarang.

Persita Tangerang
In 2020, Syaeful Anwar signed a one-year contract with Indonesian Liga 1 club Persita Tangerang. This season was suspended on 27 March 2020 due to the COVID-19 pandemic. The season was abandoned and was declared void on 20 January 2021.

Arema
On 27 April 2022, Anwar announced by Arema to join the squad.

Honours

Club 
Semen Padang
 Liga 2 runner-up: 2018

Arema
 Indonesia President's Cup: 2022

References

External links 
Syaeful Anwar at Soccerway
Syaeful Anwar at Liga Indonesia

1994 births
Living people
Indonesian footballers
Association football defenders
Liga 1 (Indonesia) players
Liga 2 (Indonesia) players
Arema F.C. players
Persita Tangerang players
Semen Padang F.C. players
PSPS Pekanbaru players
PSPS Riau players
Persibat Batang players
Bali United F.C. players
Persib Bandung players
Sportspeople from Central Java